Kyle Israel (born August 25, 1985 in Orlando, Florida) was the starting college football quarterback for the UCF Knights football team at the University of Central Florida.  He majored in radio/television at UCF. He is a graduate of University High School. Currently, he plays for the Orlando Predators of the National Arena League.  

He also played for the Dresden Monarchs in the German Football League.

2006
Israel started for the UCF as a junior in 2006; he played in nine games and threw for

2007
Israel completed 12 of 24 passing attempts as he led the 2007 UCF Knights football team to a season-opening upset of North Carolina State; the victory was the program's second victory over a BCS opponent and the first time the Knights defeated a BCS school since 2000.

On September 15, 2007, he started for the first football game held on the UCF campus in the new Bright House Networks Stadium. The game was against the number-six ranked 2007 Texas Longhorns, the highest ranked team ever faced by the Knights.

2009 Germany 
Israel signed and played for the Dresden Monarchs. A team in the German Football League.

References

External links
 Official Player Bio at UCF Knights

American football quarterbacks
Living people
UCF Knights football players
1985 births
Players of American football from Orlando, Florida
German Football League players
American expatriate sportspeople in Germany
American expatriate players of American football